Bad Blumau is a municipality and spa town in the district of Hartberg-Fürstenfeld in Styria, Austria.

It has a large complex at the hot springs designed by architect Friedensreich Hundertwasser.

References

Spa towns in Austria
Cities and towns in Hartberg-Fürstenfeld District